Thunder Bay is a  lake freighter cargo vessel, built and launched in China in 2013.
The ship is owned, and operated on the Great Lakes, by the Canada Steamship Lines (CSL).

Design and description
According to the Miramar Ship Index Whitefish Bay has a gross tonnage (GT) of 24,430 and a deadweight tonnage (DWT) of 37,690 tons. However, on the CSL website, the ship is stated as measuring 24,430 GT and 34,500 DWT.

The ship is powered by one IMO Tier III MAN B&W 6S50ME diesel engine driving one shaft creating . 

CSL asserts that the new vessels will be more efficient than existing vessels, and will leave less pollution.

Construction and career
She was launched on 13 May 2013 and made her first transit of the Saint Lawrence Seaway in July 2013, and visited her namesake port, Thunder Bay, Ontario, on 27 September 2013.
Louis Martel, President of CSL, Vance Badawey, mayor of Port Colborne, and Rick Dykstra, Member of Parliament for nearby St. Catharines, Ontario, presided over a celebration of the vessel's first cargo, on 8 August 2013, when she passed through Port Colborne, bound for Quebec City with a shipment of iron ore pellets from Escanaba, Michigan.

References

External links
 CSL's Trillium class

Great Lakes freighters
2013 ships
Canada Steamship Lines
Ships built in China